Rosario Briones (born 5 October 1953) is a Mexican gymnast. She competed in six events at the 1968 Summer Olympics.

References

1953 births
Living people
Mexican female artistic gymnasts
Olympic gymnasts of Mexico
Gymnasts at the 1968 Summer Olympics
Sportspeople from San Luis Potosí
20th-century Mexican women